Kip Sundgaard (born 15 February 1956) is an American former ski jumper who competed in the 1976 Winter Olympics.

In 1973, Kip was a National Junior Team member. Additionally, he leaped , but a fall kept that effort from remaining in the record book.

Sundgaard attended the University of Utah in Salt Lake City and won the NCAA title in 1976. He also placed second that year at the Canadian Nationals. Sundgaard was on the U.S. team for eight years, competing at the 1976 Winter Olympics and several World Championships. His greatest ever jump came in 1979 in Yugoslavia on the ski flying hill (Letalnica bratov Gorišek) at Planica (now Slovenia), when he went .

Jumping for the St. Paul Ski Club, he won the St. Paul Memorial Trophy eight times, given to the winner of their annual competition. Sundgaard was inducted into the American Ski Jumping Hall of Fame in 2008.

References

Retired from 3M "Glue Factory" Dec 2013.

1956 births
Living people
American male ski jumpers
Olympic ski jumpers of the United States
Ski jumpers at the 1976 Winter Olympics